Club Athlétique Renaissance Aiglon Brazzaville, known simply as CARA Brazzaville, is a Congolese football club based in Brazzaville, Republic of the Congo, playing games out of the Stade Alphonse Massemba-Débat. The club won the 1974 African Cup of Champions Clubs, the most prestigious continental club football tournament at the time, the only major continental championship won by any Congolese club until the victory of AC Léopards in the 2012 CAF Confederation Cup.

Crest

Honours

National
Congo Premier League
Winner (6 titles): 1969, 1973, 1975, 1981, 1984, 2008
Coupe du Congo
Winner (3 titles): 1981, 1986, 1992

International
African Cup of Champions Clubs
Winner (1 title): 1974

Performance in CAF competitions
 CAF Champions League: 1 appearance
2009 – Preliminary Round

 African Cup of Champions Clubs: 7 appearances
1970: Second Round
1973: Second Round
1974: Champion
1975: Quarter-Finals
1976: Second Round
1983: Second Round
1985: Second Round

CAF Confederation Cup: 2 appearances
2014 – First Round
2015 – Preliminary Round
2018 – Quarter-Finals

CAF Cup Winners' Cup: 2 appearances
1982 – withdrew in First Round
1993 – First Round

Notable former managers
 Cicerone Manolache (1972–74)

References

External links
Team profile – footballdatabase
2015 squad – cafonline

 
Football clubs in the Republic of the Congo
Association football clubs established in 1935
Sports clubs in Brazzaville
1935 establishments in French Equatorial Africa
CAF Champions League winning clubs